KIF4B is a human protein encoded by the gene KIF4B. It is part of the kinesin family of proteins, which are motor proteins involved in many cellular processes.

Function 
KIF4B and the closely related protein KIF4A are essential for regulating anaphase spindle dynamics during mitosis.

References 

Motor proteins